Hellcrust is an Indonesian death metal band from Jakarta, formed in  by Bije, Wiro and Andyan Gorust. The band has released three albums, including one mini-album and single that all released under the label of Armstretch Record. Almost all of the members have been part of the iconic band Siksakubur, even though from different generations. Hellcrust's  fanbase community known as "Balamaut" which is a community of metal music enthusiast that loyal to the band. Nowadays, Hellcrust is one of the most influential bands in Indonesia as part of the world's most interesting underground metal scene.

History 
It was started through an event of Misery Index played in Jakarta early , Wiro (Death Valley) and Bije (Straightout) were inspired to form a band that has similar genre, then both invited Andyan Nasary Suryadi known as Andyan Gorust (DeadSquad) to join a new project band with the commitment to making songs and record directly. Then Gorust selected his bandmate Bonny (DeadSquad) and Ario (Carnivored) to complete the line-up through an audition, so the Hellcrust inaugural formation goes straight to the recording process. Hellcrust's unique musicality is freed to each of the member's potential and improvisations to express themselves in the song making until the song materials are worthy to be executed. Hellcrust's logo was designed and created by M. Asrul from Makassar, Indonesia as the winner of Hellcrust's logo making contest.

Early Formation dan EP Debut (2012-2013) 
The EP composed of 5 songs (all in Indonesian) of "Agresi Semu", "Budak Kehidupan", "Doktrinisasi Karat", "Jerat Ilusi" dan "Hitam Dunia", with new color of its musicality to enrich the dynamics of metal music scene in Indonesia. The EP debut was recorded in BeeSound Studio and mixing process was engineered by Joseph Manurung at Blessing Studio, both in Jakarta that took 9 days since early . The Album artwork was designed by Mark Cooper, a designer from "Mindrape Art" based in Florida, United States.

Bonny, Ario and Wiro departure (2013-2015) 
The substitution of band members is unavoidable that both Gorust and Bonny were actively involved in DeadSquad by that time, where Gorust was also as one of the initiators of the band with Bonny and Stevie Item since . The band members' turnover was started when Bonny left the band around  then replaced by Alan, a session player musician played for Carnivored and briefly played for Funeral Inception until recruited as replacement Bassist for Bonny in DeadSquad then became permanent member in Hellcrust since . So eventually Bije and Gorust were reunited with their bandmate Baken and Japra (also known as "Japs"), both are former members of Siksakubur to complete the line-up.

Kalamaut (2016-2018) 
Attended by fellow musicians, news reporters and of course "Balamaut", a metalheads community and enthusiast that loyal to the band. Hellcrust played 8 out of the 10 songs of this album started from "Janji Api" until Japs duet with former vocalist Wiro singing "Kendali Kuasa" and the event was closed through "Bingkai Bangkai". The theme of this album is about social criticism and placed as the winner "Album of The Year" by "Hammersonic Metal Awards 2016", a largest metal music events in Southeast Asia "Hammersonic Festival". This album composed of 10 songs covering intro "Kalamaut" as an opening that also included songs contribute by Hellcrust's former members Ario before he left the band of "Janji Api", "Pancung Suara", "Geram Terjaga", "Bingkai Bangkai" and Wiro as guest vocalist in "Kendali Kuasa". 
Kalamaut has been reviewed by most of Indonesian music portals as described by Samack from WarningMagz as "...a secret weapon for good music is writing quality lyrics, Kalamaut has succeeded in having these rare classifications as this album is different from their previous debut release, Hellcrust can now advance as one of the sharp and challenging death metal music band...". Kalamaut has also listed as WarningMagz's 10 Best Metal Album. Then Angga from DCDC online music portal also described as "...this is the dedication of Hellcrust to those who curse, for the sake of their mouths being silenced, they silently struggle to wait for the right time...".

The substitution of band members is unavoidable that both Gorust and Bonny are still actively involved in DeadSquad by that time, where Gorust was also as one of the initiators of the band with Bonny and Stevie Item since , and Bije also actively involved in Straighout. The band members' turnover was started when Bonny left the band around  then replaced by Alan, a session player musician played for Carnivored and briefly played for Funeral Inception until recruited as replacement Bassist for Bonny in DeadSquad then became permanent member in Hellcrust since . So eventually Bije and Gorust were reunited with their bandmate Baken and Japra (also known as "Japs"), both are former members of Siksakubur to complete the line-up.

Rimba Khalayak (single) (2019) 
The positive message from the song is how to behave and be wise in social media. "Rimba Khalayak" literally meaning is jungle or crowded audiences. The recording process of this single was started in mid  at Three Sixty Studio, Jakarta, that took 2 days recording sessions for Drum, Guitar and Bass then a few days for Vocal recordings following by mixing and mastering processes. The musicality is sharpened and improved from the previous albums as its intended as pre-release trigger for the next album of "Sejawat" (released in mid ). Hellcrust tries to present a fast, dense but easy to hear, catchy and anthemic. This single was managed with sole guitar formation after the departure of Baken in the previous year.

Sejawat (2020-Present) 
This album is dedicated to Balamaut that included the song titled "Balamaut" of the 9 songs composed in the album, started from previous single "Rimba Khalayak" as an opening and an instrumental song "Transisi" at the end. The recording process of Sejawat began from certain parts of the songs that recorded independently by Bije and Alan, however the overall 'brainstorming' recording process started since they working on "Rimba Khalayak". This album was produced by Hellcrust in collaboration with Santo Gunawan from Armstretch Records, distributed via Merch Cons distribution. The delay also has an impact on Hellcrust's tour plan for the album promotions for an indefinite period of time, as they focused on utilizing streaming media platform to help promote the album.

Japs departure (2020) 
Shortly after the completion of the album, Japs quit the band to chase his career outside music activity that made this is the last and farewell album for him.

In May 2022, when Hellcrust performed live performance show along with Burgerkill and Punk band from Bandung Closehead, there was a change in the band's formation as Andyan Gorust announced about a new formation of the band, in the absence of Asep (vocalist) who focused on his new band, then his position was taken over by Derik. Meanwhile, Alan's position was replaced by bassist Donirro Hayashi (Vox Mortis), through an earlier open audition.

Band members 

Current members
 Andyan Gorust – Drum (–present)
 Nyoman "Bije" Saputra Wardana – Guitar (–present)
 Dirk "Derik" Marthin - Guitar , Lead Vocal (-present)
 Donirro Hayashi - Bass (2022-present)

Former members
 Prahari "Japra" Mahardika - Vocal (–)
 Baken Nainggolan – Guitar (-)
 Ario Nugroho – Guitar (-)
 Bonny Sidharta – Bass (-)
 "Wiro" Wirsky – Vocal (-)
 Septian "Asep" Maulana - Vocal (-2021)
 Arslan "Alan" Musyfia – Bass (–2022)

Timeline

Discography 

 Dosa (EP) (2012)
 Kalamaut (2016)
 Sejawat (2020)

Accolades 

| Ref.
|-
| style="text-align:left;"| 2020
| "Rimba Khalayak"
| Best Metal Production Works - (AMI) Awards
|
|

|-
| style="text-align:left;"| 2017
| "Hellcrust"
| Breakthrough of The Year - Hammersonic Awards
|
|
|-
| style="text-align:left;"| 2016
| "Kalamaut"
| Best Album of The Year - Hammersonic Awards
|
|
|-

Balamaut 
"Balamaut" is the Hellcrust's fanbase that grouped in the form of metalheads community based on the regions throughout Indonesia. The community is well managed with the promising growth to accommodate all of the interests and communications between members in the community with each of Hellcrust's band members, as well as marketplace to promote the official and community merchandises and accessories that produced by both Hellcrust Official and the community itself. Balamaut has an insignia or logo as an attribute marked with regional name of each regions that will unite them in every Hellcrust stage performances. Hellcrust dedicated song of "Balamaut" in their third album of Sejawat (released on ) for the community.

References

External links 
 
 Hellcrust on Encyclopaedia Metallum
 

Death metal musical groups
Musical groups established in 2011
Musical groups from Jakarta
Indonesian heavy metal musical groups
2011 establishments in Indonesia